Bethany School may refer to:

Bethany School (Glendale, Ohio), United States
Bethany School, Goudhurst, Kent, England